Suchekomnaty is a Polish Coat of Arms. It was used by several szlachta families in the times of the Polish–Lithuanian Commonwealth.

History

Blazon

Notable bearers
Notable bearers of this Coat of Arms include:

 Aniela Miączyńska
 Stanisław Skalski

See also
 Polish heraldry
 Heraldry
 Coat of Arms

External links 
  Suchekomnaty Coat of Arms & bearers.

Sources
 Dynastic Genealogy

Suchekomnaty